The MXR Distortion + ("Distortion Plus") is a distortion pedal originally designed in the 1970s by MXR Innovations.

The pedal uses a single op-amp and a pair of germanium diodes to ground (parallel-push) for clipping in a very simple configuration with only Output and Distortion controls, no tone control; the pedal uses no discrete transistors.  Turning up the Distortion control increases the amount of distortion and at the same time boosts the treble in the signal.

The pedal's crunchy heavy metal sound was featured by Randy Rhoads in his work with Ozzy Osbourne. Jerry Garcia of the Grateful Dead used this pedal exclusively for distortion in the late 1970s. Bob Mould of Hüsker Dü also used the Distortion + as part of his trademark guitar sound. Dave Murray of Iron Maiden has used Distortion + since the early 1980s. Steve Wynn (musician) used it on the first couple Dream Syndicate albums. Thom Yorke of Radiohead has included the Distortion + for many of his signature distortion sounds, using a variety of guitars to achieve various tonal options. Rowland S. Howard (The Birthday Party/These Immortal Souls/Crime & the City Solution/Solo albums) also used this pedal across his career. Though typically not much of a pedal user, guitarist Slash has talked about using the Distortion + in his early guitar days to help define his tone.

References

Effects units